Hasanabad (also Romanized as Ḩasanābād; also known as Ḩoseynābād) is a village in Salami Rural District, Salami District, Khaf County, Razavi Khorasan Province, Iran. At the 2006 census, its population was 826, in 173 families.

References 

Populated places in Khaf County